Shimmering Light is a 1978 Australian television film about an American surfer who travels to Australia in search of the perfect wave. It was one of six TV movies made in Australia by Transatlantic Enterprises. It was directed by Don Chaffey.

Plot
Kevin Pearse is a 29-year-old drop-out who lives off his family trust and spends most of his time surfing. He is seeing two women, young Emily and older Moira. His father Scan arrives.

Cast
Beau Bridges as Kevin Pearse
Lloyd Bridges as Sean Pearse
Ingrid Mason as Emily
Victoria Shaw as Moira

Release
This telefilm was originally aired by ABC on December 12, 1978. It released in theatres at Germany on May 17, 1979 and later aired by BBC One and HBO on February 13, 1980. This telefilm was also aired by BBC Two and Cinemax from June 18, 1981 to July 1, 1981. It reran on The Movie Channel from November 9, 1981 to April 23, 1983. In Portugal, RTP1 and RTP2 aired the telefilm in May 1983. In Spain, TVE1 and TVE2 aired the telefilm in May 1983. In Netherlands, NPO 1 aired the telefilm in October 1982. In Italy, RAI aired the telefilm in October 1983.

On September 23, 1985, Academy Home Entertainment released the film as Mutual Respect on VHS. On March 15, 1988, Video Treasures also released the film on VHS.

Reception
The Sydney Morning Herald wrote "The end product is really half-hearted. The idea was good, the acting similar. But, in the end, the Bridges family and their fellow actors were betrayed by a really ordinary script." Another reviewer in the same paper called it "a first rate telemovie."

References

External links

 
 

Australian television films
Films directed by Don Chaffey